Iotatubothrips is a genus of thrips in the family Phlaeothripidae. The genus was first described in 1992 by Mound and Crespi, and the type species is Iotatubothrips crozieri. The species of this genus are native to Australia. They create galls in Casuarinas.

Species
 Iotatubothrips crozieri
 Iotatubothrips kranzae

References

Phlaeothripidae
Thrips
Thrips genera
Taxa described in 1992